Songs for Japan is a charity compilation album created to benefit relief efforts for the 2011 Tōhoku earthquake and tsunami. A collaborative project between the music industry's "big four" record labels (EMI, Sony, Universal, and Warner), the album was released through the iTunes Store on March 25, 2011 through Universal. Royalties for the songs featured on the album were waived so that all proceeds may be donated to the Japanese Red Cross Society. A physical album was released on April 4, 2011 through Sony.  It is no longer available for download in the USA iTunes store.

Reception
Although Songs for Japan received praise for its charitable purpose it was criticized for being a compilation of already released songs, with the exception of Lady Gaga's remixed "Born This Way". This is unlike past charity albums such as Hope for Haiti Now that have included original music and performances.

Commercial performance

The album sold 68,000 copies in its first sales week in the United States, debuting at number six on the Billboard 200. It sold 8,000 copies in Canada and debuted at number three on the Canadian Albums Chart. On the Recording Industry Association of New Zealand's compilations chart, the album debuted at number one. As of May 4, 2011, over 500,000 copies of the album have been sold, and over $5 million has been raised.

The album was certified as a gold record by the RIAJ in Japan for a shipment of 100,000 or more physical copies.

Track listing 
The CD features 37 tracks, while the iTunes version contains 38 tracks.

Charts

Weekly charts

Year-end charts

References 

2011 compilation albums
2011 Tōhoku earthquake and tsunami relief
Charity albums
Sony Music compilation albums
Universal Music Group compilation albums
Warner Music Group compilation albums
EMI Records compilation albums
Songs about the 2011 Tōhoku earthquake and tsunami